Vilasobroso is a small village in the southwest of Galicia, Spain. It is both  an ecclesiastical parish within the municipality of Mondariz, known as San Martiño de Vilasobroso, and an administrative lesser local entity. As an lesser local entity it is only one of nine administrative divisions directly below a municipality in the whole of Galicia. According to the 2008 census the village has a population 367 (173 men and 194 women).

Twin towns
  Sobrosa (2013)

Notable people
  Alejo Carrera Muñoz, journalist and restorer of the castle (1893—1967)

See also
 Sobroso Castle
 Marquessate of Sobroso

External links
 San Martiño de Vilasobroso at Turgalicia.es

Churches in Galicia (Spain)